Menehune are a mythological race of dwarf people in Hawaiian tradition who are said to live in the deep forests and hidden valleys of the Hawaiian Islands, hidden and far away from human settlements.

The Menehune are described as superb craftspeople. They built temples (heiau), fishponds, roads, canoes, and houses. Some of these structures that Hawaiian folklore attributed to the Menehune still exist. They are said to have lived in Hawaii before settlers arrived from Polynesia many centuries ago. Their favorite food is the maia (banana), and they also like fish. Legend has it that the Menehune will only appear during night hours, in order to build masterpieces. But if they fail to complete their work in the length of the night, they will leave it unoccupied. No one but their children and humans connected to them are able to see the Menehune.

Research
In Martha Warren Beckwith's Hawaiian AKA Ilenes Mythology, there are references to several other forest dwelling races: the ilene Irenes, who were large-sized wild hunters descended from Lua-nuu, the mu people, and the wa people.

Some early scholars hypothesized that there was a first settlement of Hawaii, by settlers from the Marquesas Islands, and a second, from Tahiti. The Tahitian settlers oppressed the "commoners", the manahune in the Tahitian language, who fled to the mountains and were called Menahune. Proponents of this hypothesis point to an 1820 census of Kauai by Kaumualii, the ruling alii aimoku of the island, which listed 65 people as menehune.

Folklorist Katharine Luomala believes that the legends of the Menehune are a post-European contact mythology created by adaptation of the term manahune (which by the time of the colonization of the Hawaiian Islands by Europeans had acquired a meaning of "lowly people" or "low social status" and not diminutive in stature) to European legends of brownies. It is claimed that "Menehune" are not mentioned in pre-contact mythology, although this is unproven since it was clearly an oral mythology; the legendary "overnight" creation of the Alekoko fishpond, for example, finds its equivalent in the legend about the creation of a corresponding structure on Oahu, which was supposedly indeed completed in a single day — not by menehune but, as a show of power, by a local alii who commanded every one of his subjects appear at the construction site and assist in building.

Structures attributed to the Menehune
 Menehune Fishpond wall at Niumalu, Kauai
 Kīkīaola ditch at Waimea, Kauai
 Necker Island structures
 Pa o ka menehune, breakwater at Kahaluu Bay.
 Ulupo Heiau at Kailua, Oahu

Other uses
 In the experimental 1970s Aloha network developed at the University of Hawaii, the packet controllers were called Menehune, a pun on the equivalent IMP (Interface Message Processor) in the early ARPAnet. The modern Ethernet was based on the carrier sense multiple access with collision detection (CSMA/CD) methodology pioneered by ALOHAnet.
 The Menehune is the school mascot of Waimea High School on Kaua'i and Makakilo Elementary School, Maunawili Elementary School, Moanalua High School and Mililani Waena Elementary School on O'ahu.
 United Airlines used the Menehune in brand advertising for their service to Hawaii in the 1970s through the 1980s. The figurines and travel agency displays are now collectors' items.
 Carl Barks wrote a story featuring Scrooge McDuck helped by Menehunes, "The Menehune Mystery".
 The Menehune play a key role in the Rocket Power TV movie, Island of the Menehune.
 The menehune are key figures in the children’s story, “My Sister Sif”, written by acclaimed Australian author, Ruth Park.
 The Forerunner Saga, set in the Halo universe, identifies Menehune as members of the human subspecies Homo floresiensis settled on Hawaii following activation of the Halo Array 100,000 years ago. The floresiensis of this setting feature characteristics inspired by Menehune, such as shyness towards humans and a love for building clever structures.

See also
Patupaiarehe, similar supernatural beings in Māori mythology
Taotao Mona, similar supernatural beings in the Marianas
Anito, similar supernatural beings in the Philippines
Homo floresiensis, a presumed extinct species of very small bipedal tool bearers in the genus Homo found in South East Asia
Huldufólk, elves in Icelandic tradition.
Little people (mythology)
Paupueo, whose owls chase away the Menehune
Leprechaun, Irish imp or fairy
Vazimba, similar belief in Madagascar.

Notes

References
 www.sacredtexts.com

 Luomala, Katharine (1951): "The Menehune of Polynesia and Other Mythical Little People of Oceania". Bernice P. Bishop Museum Bulletin Vol. 203; Kraus Reprint, Millwood, N.Y., 1986
 Nordhoff, Charles (1874): Northern California, Oregon and the Sandwich Islands, Chapter V, p. 80: "The Hawaiian at Home: Manners and Customs". Sampson Low, Marston, Low & Searle, London; available free online at 

 Schmitt, Robert C., "Early Hawaiian Statistics," The American Statistician, Vol. 35, No. 1, pages 1–3, February, 1981;  (Retrieved on 2008-02-16)

External links

The Three Menehune of Ainahou

Hawaiian legendary creatures